The Luoyang Christmas fire was a major fire that occurred in Luoyang, in China's Henan Province, on 25 December 2000, killing 309 people.

Incident
A fire, triggered by sparks from welding activity at the Dongdu building, broke out in the basement at 9:35 p.m. local time, trapping construction workers on the second and third floors. It was extinguished by 12:45 a.m Tuesday. Some 800 police officers and firefighters and 26 fire engines rushed to the scene after receiving the call.

A total of 309 people were killed in the fire: 174 females and 135 males. Among the dead were construction workers working on the second and third floors and nightclub patrons who were attending a gala celebration for Christmas Day at a dancing hall on the fourth floor.

Aftermath
An emergency meeting was held early Tuesday morning in the province and in the afternoon, Shi Wanpeng, vice-minister of the State Economic and Trade Commission, also arrived in Luoyang. To prevent similar accidents, the Ministry of Public Security released an urgent circular, asking local governments to spare no efforts to ensure safety during the New Year's Day and the Spring Festival holidays.

See also

List of nightclub fires

References

Extended reading
Compilation of news articles on Sina.com
  

Documentary
河南洛阳东都商厦12·25火灾. Editor:何杰, Scriptwriter:任志军, Photography:孙小磊. Duration: 13 minutes 45 seconds. Uploaded to QQ video, Bilibili video.

History of Luoyang
2000 disasters in China
Building and structure fires in China
2000 fires in Asia
Nightclub fires
December 2000 events in China